Tsai Chi-chang (born 16 April 1969) is a Taiwanese politician. He was elected to the Legislative Yuan in Taichung's first constituency in 2012 and re-elected in 2016. He is currently the Deputy Speaker of Legislative Yuan, having served in this role since 1 February 2016. An agreement for him to become Commissioner of Taiwan's Chinese Professional Baseball League (CPBL) was reached in December 2020 as the previous Commissioner's term was ending, and he was formally elected to the post on 19 January 2021, succeeding John Wu.

Education
Tsai obtained his bachelor's and master's degrees in history from Tunghai University and Executive Master of Business Administration (EMBA) from National Chung Hsing University.

CPBL Commissioner
Tsai Chi-chang became the commissioner for Taiwan's CPBL in January 2021. During his first year as Commissioner, he further expanded CPBL from five teams to six teams, with the addition of Taiwan Steel Group.

References

Living people
1969 births
Democratic Progressive Party Members of the Legislative Yuan
Members of the 8th Legislative Yuan
Members of the 9th Legislative Yuan
Members of the 6th Legislative Yuan
National Chung Hsing University alumni
Taichung Members of the Legislative Yuan
Tunghai University alumni
Members of the 10th Legislative Yuan
Chinese Professional Baseball League commissioners